Jonas Gagnon (August 31, 1846 – July 3, 1915) was an American businessman, tugboat captain, and politician.

Born in Dunham, Canada, Gagnon and his parents emigrated to the United States in 1849 and settled in Two Rivers, Wisconsin. Gagnon worked in the fishing industry and was the captain of the tug boat: M. E. Gagnon, that Gagnon and his brothers owned. Then Gagnon and his brothers own Gagnon Brothers a mercantile business in Two Rivers. Gagnon served on the Two Rivers Common Council, the Manitowoc County, Wisconsin Board of Supervisors, and school commissioner on the Two Rivers School Board. From 1899 to 1903, Gagnon served in the Wisconsin State Assembly as a Democrat. Gagnon died at his home in Two Rivers, Wisconsin.

Notes

1846 births
1915 deaths
Pre-Confederation Canadian emigrants to the United States
People from Two Rivers, Wisconsin
Businesspeople from Wisconsin
School board members in Wisconsin
Wisconsin city council members
County supervisors in Wisconsin
Democratic Party members of the Wisconsin State Assembly
19th-century American politicians
19th-century American businesspeople